The Mental Health (Discrimination) Act 2013 (introduced into Parliament as the Mental Health (Discrimination) (No. 2) Bill) is an Act of Parliament of the United Kingdom introduced to the House of Commons by Gavin Barwell, the Conservative Member of Parliament (MP) for Croydon Central.

The Bill passed its House of Commons second reading on 14 September 2012.

There are four sections of the Act.

Section 1 ("Members of Parliament etc") removes from the Mental Health Act 1983 the provision that disqualifies from the House of Commons a member sectioned for over six months under that Act.  Section 2 ("Jurors") qualifies the restrictions of jury members who are receiving mental health treatment. Section 3 ("Company directors") modifies Regulations in relation to the employment of director's appointments. The final section gives the Secretary of State power to determine when the section relating to juries take effect; the other provisions came into force with Royal Assent.

The then Leader of the Opposition, Ed Miliband, said the Bill would bring public understanding of mental health "into the 21st century".

References

United Kingdom Acts of Parliament 2013
Mental health law in the United Kingdom